

Season 
When Trapattoni left Inter, in order to coach Juventus again, the club found his substitute in Corrado Orrico. Despite being UEFA Cup defending champions, the European title was lost. It was due to Boavista, who passed the round with a 2–1 aggregate (2–1 and 0–0 were the results). Midway through the league, due to the poor trend, Orrico was replaced by Luis Suárez. The Spanish, former Inter player, did not manage to improve the performances whilst Zenga saw his relationship with supporters deteriorate. Desideri, was also cut from the team after have mocking the coach (following a goal celebration). Drawing half of the total games (17 out of 34) Inter failed - for the first time since 1975 - a European placement, finishing only eighth.

Squad

Goalkeepers
  Walter Zenga
  Beniamino Abate

Defenders
  Giuseppe Bergomi
  Giuseppe Baresi
  Andreas Brehme
  Sergio Battistini
  Riccardo Ferri
  Antonio Paganin
  Marcello Montanari
  Marco Grossi
  Pasquale Rocco

Midfielders
  Angelo Orlando
  Lothar Matthäus
  Alessandro Bianchi
  Nicola Berti
  Davide Fontolan
  Stefano Desideri
  Dino Baggio
  Fausto Pizzi

Attackers
  Jürgen Klinsmann
  Marco Delvecchio
  Massimo Ciocci
  Maurizio Iorio

Competitions

Serie A

League table

Matches

Coppa Italia

Second round

Eightfinals

Quarterfinals

UEFA Cup 

Round of 32

Top scorers
  Jürgen Klinsmann 7
  Lothar Matthäus 4
  Stefano Desideri 4

Notes

References

Sources
  RSSSF - Italy 1991/92

Inter Milan seasons
Internazionale